"Bad" Bennie Briscoe (February 8, 1943 – December 28, 2010) was an American professional boxer. A fan favorite for his punching power, he was known as the "quintessential Philadelphia boxer," and one of the greatest fighters of his era who due to various reasons did not become a world champion.

"Bad" Bennie fought from 1962 to 1982, and retired with a career record of 66 wins (53 by KO) 24 losses and 5 draws. Briscoe was a top-rated middleweight contender during the 1970s, unsuccessfully challenging for the WBC and WBA world titles on three occasions. Notable former champions and contenders Brisoce fought included Marvin Hagler, Carlos Monzon, Rodrigo Valdéz, Luis Rodríguez, Vicente Rondon, Tony Mundine, Vito Antuofermo, Eddie Mustafa Muhammad, Emile Griffith, and Vinnie Curto.

Cus D'Amato regarded Briscoe much higher than most of his highly decorated opponents in many respects, particularly for his determination, intimidating posture, constant forward movement, aggressiveness, iron jaw, and ability to absorb punches no matter how solid he was hit, creating an impression of irresistible force to great many of his opponents. Briscoe's relentless walk-forward style earned him a nickname "Black Robot" while fighting abroad (for that reason, French cartoonist Dero portrayed Briscoe as a robot with hammers instead of arms,) forcing even such aggressive fighters as Hagler and Monzon to back-up consistently. He was also sometimes referred to as "the fighting trashman," because he balanced his training early in his career with a day job as a sanitation worker in South Philadelphia.

Early life
Briscoe was born in Augusta, Georgia, to a poor family, one of fourteen children. Usually bold Briscoe said that the reason his hair is cut very short is that "When you're one of fourteen children they can't waste too much money on haircuts," and when he used to go to the barbershop, his father would say "Take it all off." Motivated by his family's poverty, at the age of 16, he moved from Augusta, where he was a star athlete in football and track and field, to Philadelphia, Pennsylvania to live with an aunt and uncle and attended Simon Gratz High School. There, he eventually began training alongside Joe Frazier, hence is his familiar bobbing-and-weaving style.

Briscoe supported his family, and his mother in particular, sending home a bit of each payday. He worked a series of municipal jobs, including as a sewer inlet cleaner and rat control officer. He eventually took a job with the sanitation department, working on a trash route in South Philadelphia as he continued to train as a boxer. A union worker, he was a member of AFSCME District Council 33.

Amateur career
Briscoe had a standout career as an amateur, compiling a record of 70–3.
He won the Middle Atlantic AAU title three times, the last in 1962 at Convention Hall in Philadelphia.
Though he did not make it to win the United States National Boxing Championships in Pocatello, April 7, 1961, and in Cincinnati, March 31, 1962, losing to H.C. Massey and to Wade Smith respectively.
He turned pro shortly thereafter, being coached by Quinzel McCall.

Despite going pro, Briscoe knew that the life of a boxer could be financially unstable and risky—and wanted to retain his union pension plan—so he continued his work on the trash route until 1973.

Professional career
Bennie was known for his toughness, strong punch and body punching. He fought future middleweight champion Monzon to a draw in Buenos Aires on May 6, 1967, but dropped a 15-round decision to the champion in a 1972 title match.

By the end of 1972, having 56 professional fights under his belt, Briscoe has been floored only three times in his career, twice in the same fight in the 1st round, which he ended with a knockout victory in the 2nd round. Among his first-round victories was also a one-punch-knockout, a further proof of his outstanding punching power.

Briscoe was outpointed by former welterweight and middleweight king Emile Griffith in their first match, but fought Griffith to a draw in a rematch. He was outpointed by future middleweight champions Marvin Hagler and Vito Antuofermo on the downside of his career.

Bennie also fought Rodrigo Valdez three times. He was outpointed twice, but Valdez scored a rare KO over Briscoe in an elimination match to determine the WBC middleweight champion on May 25, 1974 - it was the only time in 96 fights that Briscoe was ever stopped. The WBC had decided to "strip" Monzon of its version of the middleweight crown, although the rest of the world continued to recognize Monzon as champion.

In March 1981, neurosurgeon Dr. Fred Sonstein sought to use CAT scans in an attempt to track the degeneration of boxers' cognitive functions after seeing the decline of Briscoe's speech abilities.

Briscoe was one of the most feared middleweights of his era. In 2003, he was named in The Ring's list of 100 greatest punchers of all time.  His final record was 66-24-5 with 53 knockouts and one no contest.

Briscoe fought with the Star of David on his boxing trunks in tribute to his managers, first Jimmy Iselin, whose father Phil owned the New York Jets, and Arnold M. Weiss.

Professional boxing record

|-
| style="text-align:center;" colspan="8"|66 Wins (53 knockouts, 13 decisions), 24 Losses (1 knockout, 23 decisions), 5 Draws, 1 No Contest 
|-  style="text-align:center; background:#e3e3e3;"
|  style="border-style:none none solid solid; "|Result
|  style="border-style:none none solid solid; "|Opp.Record
|  style="border-style:none none solid solid; "|Opponent
|  style="border-style:none none solid solid; "|Type
|  style="border-style:none none solid solid; "|Round
|  style="border-style:none none solid solid; "|Date
|  style="border-style:none none solid solid; "|Location
|  style="border-style:none none solid solid; "|Notes
|-
|Loss
|66–24–5 
|align=left| Jimmie Sykes
|UD
|10
|15/12/1982
|align=left| The Blue Horizon, Philadelphia, Pennsylvania, United States
|align=left|
|-
|Loss
|66–23–5 
|align=left| Ralph Hollett
|SD
|10
|01/06/1982
|align=left| Halifax Forum, Halifax, Nova Scotia, Canada
|align=left|
|-
|Win
|66–22–5 
|align=left| Norberto Sabater
|TKO
|5
|23/03/1982
|align=left| Tropicana Hotel & Casino, Atlantic City, New Jersey, United States
|align=left|
|-
|Win
|65–22–5 
|align=left| Rick Noggle
|KO
|6
|23/12/1981
|align=left| Canton Memorial Civic Center, Canton, Ohio, United States
|align=left|
|-
|Loss
|64–22–5 
|align=left| Nick Ortiz
|SD
|10
|30/01/1981
|align=left| Felt Forum, New York City, United States
|align=left|
|-
|Loss
|64–21–5 
|align=left| Vinnie Curto
|PTS
|10
|15/12/1980
|align=left| Hynes Convention Center, Boston, Massachusetts, United States
|align=left|
|-
|Win
|64–20–5 
|align=left| Richie "The Bandit" Bennett
|PTS
|10
|25/08/1980
|align=left| Martin Luther King Arena, Philadelphia, Pennsylvania, United States
|align=left|
|-
|Loss
|63–20–5 
|align=left| Richie "The Bandit" Bennett
|UD
|10
|24/01/1980
|align=left| Upper Darby Forum, Upper Darby, Pennsylvania, United States
|align=left|
|-
|Loss
|63–19–5 
|align=left| Clement Tshinza
|PTS
|10
|20/10/1979
|align=left| Country Hall du Sart Tilman, Liege, Belgium
|align=left|
|-
|Win
|63–18–5 
|align=left| Teddy Mann
|UD
|10
|11/09/1979
|align=left| Philadelphia Spectrum, Philadelphia, Pennsylvania, United States
|align=left|
|-
|Win
|62–18–5 
|align=left| Joe Barrientes
|TKO
|6
|14/08/1979
|align=left| Steel Pier Arena, Atlantic City, New Jersey, United States
|align=left|
|-
|Win
|61–18–5 
|align=left| Nick Ortiz
|PTS
|10
|23/05/1979
|align=left| DC Armory, Washington, District of Columbia, United States
|align=left|
|-
|Loss
|60–18–5 
|align=left| David "Chevy" Love
|UD
|10
|05/02/1979
|align=left| Philadelphia Spectrum, Philadelphia, Pennsylvania, United States
|align=left|
|-
|Loss
|60–17–5 
|align=left| Marvin Hagler
|UD
|10
|24/08/1978
|align=left| Philadelphia Spectrum, Philadelphia, Pennsylvania, United States
|align=left|
|-
|Win
|60–16–5 
|align=left| Bob "The Hunter" Patterson
|KO
|5
|24/05/1978
|align=left| Philadelphia Spectrum, Philadelphia, Pennsylvania, United States
|align=left|
|-
|Win
|59–16–5 
|align=left| Tony Chiaverini
|TKO
|8
|31/03/1978
|align=left| Kansas City Municipal Auditorium, Kansas City, Missouri, United States
|align=left|
|-
|Loss
|58–16–5 
|align=left| Vito Antuofermo
|UD
|10
|04/02/1978
|align=left| Madison Square Garden, New York City, United States
|align=left|
|-
|Loss
|58–15–5 
|align=left| Rodrigo Valdez
|UD
|15
|05/11/1977
|align=left| Campione d'Italia, Italy
|align=left|
|-
|Win
|58–14–5 
|align=left| Sammy Barr
|TKO
|8
|26/07/1977
|align=left| Philadelphia Spectrum, Philadelphia, Pennsylvania, United States
|align=left|
|-
|Win
|57–14–5 
|align=left| Jean Mateo
|KO
|10
|31/03/1977
|align=left| Pavillon de Paris, Paris, France
|align=left|
|-
|Win
|56–14–5 
|align=left| Karl Vinson
|UD
|10
|17/01/1977
|align=left| Philadelphia Spectrum, Philadelphia, Pennsylvania, United States
|align=left|
|-
|style="background:#abcdef;"|Draw
|55–14–5 
|align=left| Willie "Sweetwater" Warren
|PTS
|10
|20/12/1976
|align=left| Salle Leyrit, Nice, France
|align=left|
|-
|Win
|55–14–4 
|align=left| Emetrio Villanueva
|TKO
|4
|16/08/1976
|align=left| Philadelphia Spectrum, Philadelphia, Pennsylvania, United States
|align=left|
|-
|style="background:#abcdef;"|Draw
|54–14–4 
|align=left| Emile Griffith
|PTS
|10
|26/06/1976
|align=left| Stade Louis II, Monte Carlo, Monaco
|align=left|
|-
|Win
|54–14–3 
|align=left| Eugene Hart
|KO
|1
|06/04/1976
|align=left| Philadelphia Spectrum, Philadelphia, Pennsylvania, United States
|align=left|
|-
|Win
|53–14–3 
|align=left| Jose Martin Flores
|KO
|7
|25/02/1976
|align=left| Philadelphia Arena, Philadelphia, Pennsylvania, United States
|align=left|
|-
|style="background:#abcdef;"|Draw
|52–14–3 
|align=left| Eugene Hart
|PTS
|10
|18/11/1975
|align=left| Philadelphia Spectrum, Philadelphia, Pennsylvania, United States
|align=left|
|-
|Win
|52–14–2 
|align=left| Eddie Mustafa Muhammad
|SD
|10
|18/08/1975
|align=left| Philadelphia Spectrum, Philadelphia, Pennsylvania, United States
|align=left|
|-
|Win
|51–14–2 
|align=left| Stanley "Kitten" Hayward
|UD
|10
|16/06/1975
|align=left| Philadelphia Spectrum, Philadelphia, Pennsylvania, United States
|align=left|
|-
|style="background:#abcdef;"|Draw
|50–14–2 
|align=left| Vinnie Curto
|PTS
|10
|07/04/1975
|align=left| Philadelphia Spectrum, Philadelphia, Pennsylvania, United States
|align=left|
|-
|Win
|50–14–1 
|align=left| Lenny Harden
|KO
|10
|14/01/1975
|align=left| Philadelphia Spectrum, Philadelphia, Pennsylvania, United States
|align=left|
|-
|Loss
|49–14–1 
|align=left| Emile Griffith
|MD
|10
|09/10/1974
|align=left| Philadelphia Spectrum, Philadelphia, Pennsylvania, United States
|align=left|
|-
|Loss
|49–13–1 
|align=left| Rodrigo Valdez
|TKO
|7
|25/05/1974
|align=left| Stade Louis II, Monte Carlo, Monaco
|align=left|
|-
|Win
|49–12–1 
|align=left| Tony Mundine
|KO
|5
|25/02/1974
|align=left| Palais des Sports, Paris, France
|align=left|
|-
|Win
|48–12–1 
|align=left| Willie "Sweetwater" Warren
|TKO
|7
|08/12/1973
|align=left| Boardwalk Hall, Atlantic City, New Jersey, United States
|align=left|
|-
|Win
|47–12–1 
|align=left| Ruben "El Zurdo" Arocha
|KO
|3
|22/10/1973
|align=left| Philadelphia Spectrum, Philadelphia, Pennsylvania, United States
|align=left|
|-
|Loss
|46–12–1 
|align=left| Rodrigo Valdez
|PTS
|12
|01/09/1973
|align=left| Noumea, New Caledonia
|align=left|
|-
|Win
|46–11–1 
|align=left| Billy "Dynamite" Douglas
|TKO
|8
|25/06/1973
|align=left| Philadelphia Spectrum, Philadelphia, Pennsylvania, United States
|align=left|
|-
|Win
|45–11–1 
|align=left| Art Hernandez
|TKO
|3
|26/03/1973
|align=left| Philadelphia Spectrum, Philadelphia, Pennsylvania, United States
|align=left|
|-
|Win
|44–11–1 
|align=left| Carlos Alberto Salinas
|KO
|5
|29/01/1973
|align=left| Philadelphia Spectrum, Philadelphia, Pennsylvania, United States
|align=left|
|-
|Loss
|43–11–1 
|align=left| Carlos Monzon
|UD
|15
|11/11/1972
|align=left| Estadio Luna Park, Buenos Aires, Buenos Aires, Argentina
|align=left|
|-
|Win
|43–10–1 
|align=left| Luis Vinales
|TKO
|7
|11/10/1972
|align=left| Philadelphia Arena, Philadelphia, Pennsylvania, United States
|align=left|
|-
|Loss
|42–10–1 
|align=left| Luis Vinales
|SD
|10
|19/04/1972
|align=left| Catholic Youth Center, Scranton, Pennsylvania, United States
|align=left|
|-
|Win
|42–9–1 
|align=left| Jorge Rosales
|KO
|1
|21/03/1972
|align=left| Philadelphia Arena, Philadelphia, Pennsylvania, United States
|align=left|
|-
|Win
|41–9–1 
|align=left| Al Quinney
|TKO
|2
|18/01/1972
|align=left| Philadelphia Arena, Philadelphia, Pennsylvania, United States
|align=left|
|-
|Win
|40–9–1 
|align=left| Rafael "El Presidente" Gutierrez
|KO
|2
|15/11/1971
|align=left| Philadelphia Spectrum, Philadelphia, Pennsylvania, United States
|align=left|
|-
|Win
|39–9–1 
|align=left| Charley "Bad News" Austin
|TKO
|1
|14/10/1971
|align=left| Philadelphia Arena, Philadelphia, Pennsylvania, United States
|align=left|
|-
|Win
|38–9–1 
|align=left| Juarez De Lima
|TKO
|2
|10/08/1971
|align=left| Philadelphia Spectrum, Philadelphia, Pennsylvania, United States
|align=left|
|-
|Win
|37–9–1 
|align=left| Carlos Marks
|KO
|5
|03/05/1971
|align=left| Philadelphia Arena, Philadelphia, Pennsylvania, United States
|align=left|
|-
|Win
|36–9–1 
|align=left| Tom "The Bomb" Bethea
|TKO
|6
|22/03/1971
|align=left| Philadelphia Arena, Philadelphia, Pennsylvania, United States
|align=left|
|-
|Win
|35–9–1 
|align=left| Ned Edwards
|KO
|2
|12/01/1971
|align=left| The Blue Horizon, Philadelphia, Pennsylvania, United States
|align=left|
|-
|Win
|34–9–1 
|align=left| Harold Richardson
|TKO
|6
|02/11/1970
|align=left| Philadelphia Arena, Philadelphia, Pennsylvania, United States
|align=left|
|-
|Win
|33–9–1 
|align=left| Eddie "Red Top" Owens
|KO
|6
|23/09/1970
|align=left| The Blue Horizon, Philadelphia, Pennsylvania, United States
|align=left|
|-
|Win
|32–9–1 
|align=left| Joe "Buzz" Shaw
|TKO
|7
|16/03/1970
|align=left| Philadelphia Arena, Philadelphia, Pennsylvania, United States
|align=left|
|-
|Loss
|31–9–1 
|align=left| Joe "Buzz" Shaw
|MD
|10
|18/11/1969
|align=left| Philadelphia Spectrum, Philadelphia, Pennsylvania, United States
|align=left|
|-
|Win
|31–8–1 
|align=left| Tito Marshall
|KO
|1
|30/09/1969
|align=left| The Blue Horizon, Philadelphia, Pennsylvania, United States
|align=left|
|-
|Win
|30–8–1 
|align=left| Percy Manning
|KO
|4
|19/05/1969
|align=left| Philadelphia Arena, Philadelphia, Pennsylvania, United States
|align=left|
|-
|Win
|29–8–1 
|align=left| Jose "Monon" Gonzalez
|TKO
|5
|10/03/1969
|align=left| Madison Square Garden, New York City, United States
|align=left|
|-
|Loss
|28–8–1 
|align=left| Juarez De Lima
|SD
|10
|14/02/1969
|align=left| Felt Forum, New York City, United States
|align=left|
|-
|Win
|28–7–1 
|align=left| Vicente Rondon
|TKO
|8
|26/01/1969
|align=left| San Juan, Puerto Rico, United States
|align=left|
|-
|Win
|27–7–1 
|align=left| Charley "Bad News" Austin
|SD
|10
|18/11/1968
|align=left| Philadelphia Spectrum, Philadelphia, Pennsylvania, United States
|align=left|
|-
|Win
|26–7–1 
|align=left| Pedro Miranda
|KO
|7
|02/11/1968
|align=left| San Juan, Puerto Rico, United States
|align=left|
|-
|Loss
|25–7–1 
|align=left| Vicente Rondon
|UD
|10
|23/09/1968
|align=left| Hiram Bithorn Stadium, San Juan, Puerto Rico, United States
|align=left|
|-
|Win
|25–6–1 
|align=left| Jose "Monon" Gonzalez
|UD
|10
|20/08/1968
|align=left| Madison Square Garden, New York City, United States
|align=left|
|-
|Win
|24–6–1 
|align=left| Gene "Honey Bear" Bryant
|TKO
|8
|07/08/1968
|align=left| Silver Slipper, Las Vegas, Nevada, United States
|align=left|
|-
|Loss
|23–6–1 
|align=left| Yoland Leveque
|DQ
|4
|25/03/1968
|align=left| Palais des Sports, Paris, France
|align=left|
|-
|Loss
|23–5–1 
|align=left| Luis Manuel Rodriguez
|UD
|10
|15/12/1967
|align=left| Madison Square Garden, New York City, United States
|align=left|
|-
|Win
|23–4–1 
|align=left| Jimmy Lester
|TKO
|6
|20/11/1967
|align=left| Philadelphia Convention Hall, Philadelphia, Pennsylvania, United States
|align=left|
|-
|Win
|22–4–1 
|align=left| Ike White
|TKO
|3
|30/10/1967
|align=left| Philadelphia Arena, Philadelphia, Pennsylvania, United States
|align=left|
|-
|Win
|21–4–1 
|align=left| Georgie "Deacon" Johnson
|TKO
|4
|09/10/1967
|align=left| Philadelphia Arena, Philadelphia, Pennsylvania, United States
|align=left|
|-
|Win
|20–4–1 
|align=left| Bobby "Sweet Boy" Warthen
|TKO
|7
|29/05/1967
|align=left| Philadelphia Arena, Philadelphia, Pennsylvania, United States
|align=left|
|-
|style="background:#abcdef;"|Draw
|19–4–1 
|align=left| Carlos Monzon
|PTS
|10
|06/05/1967
|align=left| Estadio Luna Park, Buenos Aires, Buenos Aires, Argentina
|align=left|
|-
|Loss
|19–4 
|align=left| Luis Manuel Rodriguez
|UD
|10
|20/03/1967
|align=left| Philadelphia Arena, Philadelphia, Pennsylvania, United States
|align=left|
|-
|Win
|19–3 
|align=left| George Benton
|RTD
|9
|05/12/1966
|align=left| Philadelphia Arena, Philadelphia, Pennsylvania, United States
|align=left|
|-
|Win
|18–3 
|align=left| C.L. Lewis
|TKO
|6
|10/10/1966
|align=left| Philadelphia Arena, Philadelphia, Pennsylvania, United States
|align=left|
|-
|style="background:#DDDDDD;"|NC
|17–3 
|align=left| C.L. Lewis
|NC
|4
|25/07/1966
|align=left| Philadelphia Convention Hall, Philadelphia, Pennsylvania, United States
|align=left|
|-
|Loss
|17–3
|align=left| Stanley "Kitten" Hayward
|SD
|10
|06/12/1965
|align=left| Philadelphia Arena, Philadelphia, Pennsylvania, United States
|align=left|
|-
|Loss
|17–2
|align=left| Tito Marshall
|UD
|10
|20/09/1965
|align=left| Philadelphia Convention Hall, Philadelphia, Pennsylvania, United States
|align=left|
|-
|Win
|17–1
|align=left| Doug McLeod
|KO
|1
|10/05/1965
|align=left| Philadelphia Arena, Philadelphia, Pennsylvania, United States
|align=left|
|-
|Win
|16–1
|align=left| Jimmy "Rent is 2 Damn High" McMillan
|KO
|1
|19/04/1965
|align=left| Philadelphia Arena, Philadelphia, Pennsylvania, United States
|align=left|
|-
|Loss
|15–1
|align=left| Percy Manning
|PTS
|10
|29/03/1965
|align=left| Philadelphia A.C., Philadelphia, Pennsylvania, United States
|align=left|
|-
|Win
|15–0
|align=left| Dave "Sugar" Wyatt
|KO
|7
|22/02/1965
|align=left| Philadelphia A.C., Philadelphia, Pennsylvania, United States
|align=left|
|-
|Win
|14–0
|align=left| "Sir" Walter Daniels
|PTS
|8
|30/11/1964
|align=left| Philadelphia Arena, Philadelphia, Pennsylvania, United States
|align=left|
|-
|Win
|13–0
|align=left| Percy Manning
|TKO
|8
|15/06/1964
|align=left| Philadelphia Convention Hall, Philadelphia, Pennsylvania, United States
|align=left|
|-
|Win
|12–0
|align=left| Charley Scott
|KO
|1
|09/03/1964
|align=left| Philadelphia Arena, Philadelphia, Pennsylvania, United States
|align=left|
|-
|Win
|11–0
|align=left| Johnny Clyde
|PTS
|6
|20/01/1964
|align=left| Philadelphia Arena, Philadelphia, Pennsylvania, United States
|align=left|
|-
|Win
|10–0
|align=left| Bobby "MI" Bell
|KO
|1
|02/12/1963
|align=left| Philadelphia Arena, Philadelphia, Pennsylvania, United States
|align=left|
|-
|Win
|9–0
|align=left| "King" Roosevelt Ware
|TKO
|4
|11/10/1963
|align=left| The Blue Horizon, Philadelphia, Pennsylvania, United States
|align=left|
|-
|Win
|8–0
|align=left| Joe "Will" Clark
|PTS
|4
|22/07/1963
|align=left| Las Vegas Convention Center, Las Vegas, Nevada, United States
|align=left|
|-
|Win
|7–0
|align=left| Cash White
|TKO
|2
|25/04/1963
|align=left| The Blue Horizon, Philadelphia, Pennsylvania, United States
|align=left|
|-
|Win
|6–0
|align=left| Chuck McCreary
|PTS
|6
|25/03/1963
|align=left| Philadelphia Arena, Philadelphia, Pennsylvania, United States
|align=left|
|-
|Win
|5–0
|align=left| "Average" Joe Smith
|KO
|6
|28/02/1963
|align=left| The Blue Horizon, Philadelphia, Pennsylvania, United States
|align=left|
|-
|Win
|4–0
|align=left| Brad Silas
|KO
|4
|11/02/1963
|align=left| Cambria A.C., Philadelphia, Pennsylvania, United States
|align=left|
|-
|Win
|3–0
|align=left| Charley Little
|KO
|1
|14/01/1963
|align=left| Cambria A.C., Philadelphia, Pennsylvania, United States
|align=left|
|-
|Win
|2–0
|align=left| Dave "Sugar" Wyatt
|KO
|3
|13/12/1962
|align=left| The Blue Horizon, Philadelphia, Pennsylvania, United States
|align=left|
|-
|Win
|1–0
|align=left| Sam Samuels
|PTS
|4
|10/09/1962
|align=left| Cambria A.C., Philadelphia, Pennsylvania, United States
|align=left|

Death
Bennie Briscoe died on December 28, 2010.

References

External links
 

1943 births
2010 deaths
Boxers from Georgia (U.S. state)
Boxers from Pennsylvania
Middleweight boxers
American male boxers
American Federation of State, County and Municipal Employees people